is a Japanese manga series written and illustrated by Tochi Ueyama. It has been serialized in Kodansha's seinen anthology magazine Morning since 1985. Kodansha has collected its into individual tankōbon volumes and it has a total of 164 volumes as of January 2023, making it one of the longest manga series by number of volumes. The story revolves around a salaryman who can cook well and full recipes for the dishes featured in each chapter are provided at the end of the chapter.

The series has been adapted into a 151-episode anime television series of the same name by Eiken and directed by Toshitaka Tsunoda. The anime series was originally broadcast in Japan on TV Asahi between April 1992 and May 1995, A Japanese television drama adaptation aired on Fuji TV on August 29, 2008.

Cooking Papa won a Special Award at the 39th Kodansha Manga Awards in 2015.

Story

The story revolves around a salaryman named Kazumi Araiwa who can cook well but is unwilling to let it be known within his workplace. He lets everyone in the company believe that his wife Nijiko Araiwa cooks his meals when, in truth, she could not prepare anything. While he cooks every dish that is found within his daily tasks everyday in life, he still needs to take care of his son Makoto Araiwa and later his baby daughter and Makoto's baby sister, Miyuki Araiwa.

Media

Manga
Cooking Papa is written and illustrated by Tochi Ueyama. The series has been serialized in the manga magazine Weekly Morning since 1985. Kodansha has collected its chapters into individual tankōbon volumes, with the first one published on January 18, 1986. As of October 21, 2022, 163 volumes have been released.

Volume list

Anime
The anime of Cooking Papa was aired on TV Asahi Thursday every week from April 9, 1992 to May 25, 1995. It was produced by Eiken and ADK Holdings, Inc. and animated by Sunshine Corporation. The anime series was directed by Toshitaka Tsunoda and ran for 151 episodes.

The anime rerun on Tokyo MX as part of the manga's 30th anniversary.

Cast
Kazumi Araiwa: Tesshō Genda
Nijiko Araiwa: Masako Katsuki
Makoto Araiwa: Minami Takayama
Miyuki Araiwa: Minami Takayama

References

External links
  
 

1985 manga
1992 anime television series debuts
Asahi Broadcasting Corporation original programming
Cooking in anime and manga
Eiken (studio)
Kodansha manga
Seinen manga
Slice of life anime and manga
TV Asahi original programming